Giuseppina "Pina" Picierno (born 10 May 1981 in Santa Maria Capua Vetere) is an Italian politician of the Democratic Party who has been serving as a member of the European Parliament since 2014.

Political career

Career in national politics
Picierno served two terms as a member of the Italian Parliament between 2008 and 2014.

Member of the European Parliament, 2014–present
Picierno was selected to head her party's regional list in the 2014 European elections. In parliament, she is a member of the Progressive Alliance of Socialists and Democrats group. She served on the Committee on Budgets from 2014 to 2017 and currently serves on the Committee on Women's Rights and Gender Equality. In addition to her committee assignments, she served as vice-chairwoman of the parliament's delegation to the EU-Mexico Joint Parliamentary Committee from 2014 to 2019.

Picierno was elected as Vice-President on 18 January 2022.

Picierno is also a member of the European Parliament Intergroup on Cancer, the European Parliament Intergroup on Fighting against Poverty, the European Parliament Intergroup on Integrity (Transparency, Anti-Corruption and Organized Crime) and of the European Parliament Intergroup on the Western Sahara.

Recognition
In 2019, Picierno was the recipient of the Justice & Gender Equality Award at The Parliament Magazine's annual MEP Awards.

References

External links 
 
 Pina Picierno at Openpolis
 Picierno views on immigration

1981 births
Living people
People from Santa Maria Capua Vetere
Democracy is Freedom – The Daisy politicians
Democratic Party (Italy) politicians
Deputies of Legislature XVI of Italy
Deputies of Legislature XVII of Italy
Members of the European Parliament for Italy
MEPs for Italy 2014–2019
MEPs for Italy 2019–2024
21st-century women MEPs for Italy
Women members of the Chamber of Deputies (Italy)